Prince Mikołaj Krzysztof Radziwiłł (2 Augustus 1549 – 28 February 1616) and nicknamed "the Orphan", was a Polish–Lithuanian nobleman (szlachcic), Ordynat of Nyasvizh from 1586, Court Marshal of Lithuania from 1569, Grand Marshal of Lithuania from 1579, castellan of Trakai from 1586, voivode of Trakai Voivodeship from 1590, voivode of Vilnius Voivodeship from 1604 and governor of Šiauliai. After the treaty at Vienna in 1515 all Radziwills were Imperial Princes and he held a position as Imperial Prince of the Holy Roman Empire.

Biography

He was nicknamed "the Orphan", in his infancy, by the Polish king Sigismund II Augustus (while his parents were still alive).

He married Halaszka Eufemia Wiśniowiecka on 24 November 1584, a Calvinist who under his influence too converted to Roman Catholicism.

He took part in the Livonian War against Muscovites. In 1573 he was a member of a diplomatic mission to France to the future king of Poland, Henry III of France.

Unlike many other members of Radziwiłł family he tried to stay away from politics, especially from the dynastic clan politics of some of other Radziwiłłs like Janusz Radziwiłł; he also supported the forces loyal to the king and Polish–Lithuanian Commonwealth during the Zebrzydowski Rebellion, a szlachta's confederation threatening the king. He attempted to convince the confederates to surrender without unnecessary bloodshed.

Like other members of the Radziwiłłs family, he couldn't escape the political ambitions of his family, and when needed, he would support it. He successfully campaigned for a royal pardon for his cousin Janusz, one of the organisers of the confederation's rokosz (rebellion). However, he also refused to support the Krzysztof 'Piorun' Radziwiłł, whose conflict with another powerful family threatened to plunge the Grand Duchy into a civil war.

Mikołaj became famous for a vivid account of his eventful pilgrimage to the Holy Land published in Latin in 1601 and later translated into Polish. During his voyage he visited not only Palestine, but also Syria, Egypt, Crete, Cyprus, Italy, and Greece. Robert Burton while on the subject of St. Elmo's fire wrote of this voyage in his Anatomy of Melancholy: "Radzivilius, the Polonian duke, calls this apparition, Sancti Germani sidus; and saith moreover that he saw the same after in a storm, as he was sailing, 1582, from Alexandria to Rhodes".

While in Rome, he met Piotr Skarga and Stanislaus Hosius, who convinced him to convert from Calvinism to Catholicism, as later did his other brothers, many upon his insistence. He was also known for his cultural and charity sponsorships. He was a founder of many cloisters, hospitals and churches. One of the chapels in the Jesuit church in Nesvizh, founded by Mikołaj Krzysztof, would become the family's mausoleum for the Radziwiłłs, serving them for the next two hundred and a half centuries. In Nieśwież, which became his seat, he also built a fortified castle. He was a patron of artists and scientists; for example he supported the works of cartographers such as Tomasz Makowski.

See also
Saul Wahl

Notes

References

Citations

Bibliography
 Karpluk M., J. Pirożyński O nieuwiarowaniu śmierci - rękopiśmienna relacja świadka ostatnich dni Elżbiety z Szydłowieckich Radziwiłłowej / / Miscellanea Staropolskie. T. Sixth Wrocław, 1990. S. 84.
 Michael Gurin . Nicholas Christopher Radziwill / / The Golden Horde: The Encyclopedia. The 3 tons / red. GP Pasha and others. Volume 2: Cadet Corps - Jackiewicz. - Minsk: Belarusian Encyclopedia, 2005. S. 494.
 Shyshygina-Potocki K. Shults and Radziwill. Mn.: "Belarus", 2007.
 Chachaj M. Zagraniczna edukacja Radziwiłłów od początku XVI do połowy XVII wieku. Lublin, 1995. S. Thirty-second.
 Z. Pietrzyk «Tylem się w Strazburku nauczył ...». Studia Mikołaja Krzysztofa Radziwiłła Sierotki w Strasburgu w latach 1563-1564 / / Odrodzenie i reformacja w Polsce. T. Forty-first - Warszawa, 1997. S. 159-162.
 Chachaj M. Zagraniczna edukacja Radziwiłłów od początku XVI do połowy XVII wieku. Lublin, 1995. S. 18, 20-21.
 T. Kempa Mikołaj Krzysztof Radziwiłł Sierotka (1549-1616). Wojewoda wileński. Warszawa, two thousand S. 32-33.
 By: Chachaj M. Zagraniczna edukacja Radziwiłłów od początku XVI do połowy XVII wieku. - Lublin, 1995. S. 17-18.
 For example: Archiwum domu Radziwiłłów. S. Forty-fourth MK Radziwill to K. Radzvilla. White, 11 April 1596.
 Testament Mikołaja Radziwiłła ZW. Czarnym wojewody wileńskiego. / / Augustyniak U. Testamenty ewangelików reformawanych w Wielkim Księstwie Litewskim. Warszawa, 1992. S. 19-20.
 Merczyng H. Mikołaj Krzysztof Radziwiłł Sirotka i jego przyjęcie katolicyzmu w r. 1567. / / Przegląd Historyczny. R. Twelfth 1911. S. 4-5.
 T. Kempa Mikołaj Krzysztof Radziwiłł Sierotka (1549-1616). Wojewoda wileński. Warszawa, two thousand S. 42-43.
 Michael Gurin . Nicholas Christopher Radziwill / / The Golden Horde: The Encyclopedia. The 3 tons / red. GP Pasha and others. Volume 2: Cadet Corps - Jackiewicz. - Minsk: Belarusian Encyclopedia, 2005. S. 495.
 Шышыгіна-Патоцкая К. Нясвіж і Радзівілы. Мн.: «Беларусь», 2007. — 240 с.: іл. ISBN 978-985-01-0740-4.
 Энцыклапедыя гісторыі Беларусі. У 6 т. Т. 6. Кн. 1: Пузыны — Усая / Беларус. Энцыкл.; Рэдкал.: Г. П. Пашкоў (галоўны рэд.) і інш.; Маст. Э. Э. Жакевіч. — Мн.: БелЭн, 2001. — 591 с.: іл. .
 The Golden Horde: The Encyclopedia. The 3 tons / red. GP Pasha and others. Volume 2: Cadet Corps - Jackiewicz. - Minsk: Belarusian Encyclopedia, 2005. - 788 s.: Il. .
 Kempa T. Mikołaj Radziwiłł Sierotka (1549—1616), wojewoda wileński. — Warszawa, 1999. .

External links
 https://archive.today/20121204134108/http://www.bspu.unibel.by/teacher/Maliugin/Ancient2/Radzivil.html
 https://web.archive.org/web/20160305071150/http://www.radziwill.by/index.php?option=com_content&view=article&id=21:2010-05-23-16-34-37&catid=8:1-&Itemid=7
 http://jivebelarus.net/at_this_day/birth-of-mikolaj-krzysztof-the-orphan-radziwill.html
 https://commons.wikimedia.org/wiki/Category:Miko%C5%82aj_Radziwi%C5%82%C5%82_the_Orphan?uselang=be-tarask
 https://archive.today/20130628043252/http://asoby.iatp.by/cont.phtml?x=mrs
 https://web.archive.org/web/20120411142259/http://arche.by/by/page/science/9570
 http://media.catholic.by/nv/n11/art9.htm

1549 births
1616 deaths
People from Ostrowiec County
Secular senators of the Polish–Lithuanian Commonwealth
Polish Princes of the Holy Roman Empire
Mikolaj Krzysztof "The Orphan"
Converts to Roman Catholicism from Calvinism
Polish Roman Catholics
Pilgrimage accounts
Polish travel writers
Grand Marshals of the Grand Duchy of Lithuania
Court Marshals of the Grand Duchy of Lithuania
Voivode of Vilnius
Voivodes of Trakai